A hospital chantry is a part of a hospital dedicated to prayer.

History
During the period 1100 to 1600 the western Latin Church developed a comprehensive theology of charity and what came to be known as Purgatory. In Scotland together with England and Wales, different traditions developed in the provision of care for the elderly, the sick and the dying.

In Scotland hospitals provided a number of functions: Travellers’ rest, care homes for elderly men and women; and sub-monastic prayer communities. Hospitals such as Bishop Dunbar’s Hospital in Old Aberdeen were in part prayer communities and in part care homes.  Most hospitals or maison Dieu had a place or room set aside as a chantry chapel, or an oratory. In the Kincardine O’Neil Hospital, the situation on a drove road offered a travellers’ rest as well as a care and prayer community. Cowan et al. provide details of some 165 hospitals that offered all or some of these functions. In England, similar conditions from the early to late medieval period applied.

In addition to care for the elderly, the church in Scotland and England became dominated by what might be called a theology of care for the elderly, The theology and practice of purgatory came to dominate the church and the country as a whole.

Across the Western world charity and purgatory became the two themes that were often in conflict. Bedehouses and hospitals were founded to meet the requirements of charity and purgatory. In response to this theology individuals often made provision for their after-life by endowing priests and others to say what became known as the Requiem Mass.

The chantry became the place where such masses where said. Chantries owe their name and function of providing an endowment or place for the maintenance of priests to sing daily mass for the souls of founders.

In some cases altars or chapels in churches were endowed in this fashion.

In Scotland Bishop Dunbar, in the months before he died in 1532, founded a "chantry" or chapel in Elgin Cathedral in memory of his father and mother.  The mortification records his wishes and obligations as follows:

Howard Colvin provides a definitive account of the origins of  chantries in England. Further evidence of their Anglo-Norman origins is provided by David Crouch. Colvin summarizes the situation as follows:

In general functions provided in chantries where they were separate establishments – e.g. Noseley,  St Anne's Chapel in Barnstaple, Devon and Lincoln Cathedral were the same as those provided in many of the medieval hospitals and bedehouses in Scotland.

See also
Hospitals in medieval Scotland
Aberdeen trades hospitals
Mitchell's Hospital Old Aberdeen
Kincardine O'Neil Hospital, Aberdeenshire
Scottish Bedesmen

Notes

References

Former cathedrals in the United Kingdom